Koukouvi Akpalo (born 12 December 1972) is a Togolese footballer. He played in 31 matches for the Togo national football team from 1993 to 1998. He was also named in Togo's squad for the 1998 African Cup of Nations tournament.

References

External links
 

1972 births
Living people
Togolese footballers
Togo international footballers
1998 African Cup of Nations players
Place of birth missing (living people)
Association football midfielders
21st-century Togolese people
SC Toulon players
Togolese expatriate footballers
Expatriate footballers in France